The Biological Resources Discipline (BRD) is a program of the United States Geological Survey (USGS). Its stated task is to work with other stakeholders to provide the scientific understanding and technologies needed to support the sound management and conservation of the United States' biological resources.

General principles
The following are "general principles" the BRD states guide the implementation of its mission and form the basis of its strategic planning:
 BRD develops scientific and statistically reliable methods and protocols to assess the status and trends of the United States's biological resources.
 BRD utilizes tools from the biological, physical, and social sciences to understand the causes of biological and ecological trends and to predict the ecological consequences of management practices.
 BRD leads in the development and use of the technologies needed to synthesize, analyze, and disseminate biological and ecological information.
 BRD strives for quality, integrity, and credibility of its research and technology by constantly improving its scientific programs through internal quality control, external peer review, and competitive funding.
 BRD enters into partnerships with scientific collaborators to produce high-quality scientific information and partnerships with the users of scientific information to ensure this information's relevance and application to real problems.
 BRD provides reliable scientific information to all American citizens while recognizing a special obligation to serve the biological information needs of Department of the Interior bureaus.

References

External links
Official site

United States Geological Survey